This article shows all the teams that have participated in the Rugby League World Cup and the results of those teams.

Team appearances by tournament

1954–1992: group format
Legend
 – Champions
 – Runners-up
GS – Group stage
 – Hosts

1995–onwards: knockout format
Legend
 – Champions
 – Runners-up
 – Semi-final
QF – Quarterfinals (knockout round of 8)
R1 – Round 1 (group stage)
  – Was not invited to qualifying
  – Did not qualify
 – Hosts

^ - Aotearoa Māori weren't a national team, but a representative side made up of players with Māori heritage.

Team appearances by continent

Team debuts
19 teams have participated in the World Cup. Between 1954 and 1972 and 1977 to 1992, England, Wales and Scotland were represented by Great Britain. From 1995 onwards Great Britain only played in test series and England, Scotland and Wales all represented themselves at major tournaments.

Results of host nations
Only Australia, New Zealand and Great Britain have won the World Cup. England hosted the 1960 and 1970 editions of the World Cup but were represented as part of Great Britain until 1995

Results of defending champions and runners-up 
The defending World Cup champions and runners-up have always automatically qualified for the following event. However, just once has the champion not played in the following edition. That was in 1975, when England and Wales took Great Britain's place.

Droughts 
This section is a list of droughts associated with the participation of national rugby league in Rugby League World Cups.

Longest active World Cup appearance droughts 
Does not include teams that have not yet made their first appearance or teams that no longer exist. Updated until qualification of the 2021 World Cup.

See also

References

External links

Rugby League World Cup
Rugby league-related lists